Dundrum Bay (Old Irish Loch Rudraige) is a bay located next to Dundrum, County Down, Northern Ireland. It is divided into the Outer Bay, and the almost entirely landlocked Inner Bay. They are separated by the dune systems of Ballykinler to the north and Murlough to the south. 

Walter Harris, a surveyor, wrote in 1744 that the 'North and South Tides meeting off this Bay and breaking upon St John's Point occasion a greater eddy or suction inwards than in other places; for many ships have found themselves embayed.' Local historian John W Hanna described in the 1860's how 'not a foot of the shore from St John's Point to Annalong but has from time to time been strewn with the broken masts and timbers of Royal and merchant ships.' The worst lost of life was 74 crew and 11 fishing boats on 13 January 1843.

The Dundrum Coastal Path, a part of the larger Lecale Way, is a hiking trail that winds along the fronts of the bay; the trek is often visited by birdwatchers. The Blackstaff River, Ardilea, Moneycarragh and the Carrigs River all empty into the bay. The inner bay comprises extensive tidal mud and sand flats and is important for wintering wildfowl.

References

Bays of Northern Ireland